The Federal Motor Vehicle Safety Standards (FMVSS) are U.S. federal vehicle regulations specifying design, construction, performance, and durability requirements for motor vehicles and regulated automobile safety-related components, systems, and design features. They are the U.S. counterpart to the UN Regulations developed by the World Forum for Harmonization of Vehicle Regulations and recognized to varying degree by most countries except the United States. Canada has a system of analogous rules called the Canada Motor Vehicle Safety Standards (CMVSS), which overlap substantially but not completely in content and structure with the FMVSS. The FMVSS/CMVSS requirements differ significantly from the international UN requirements, so private import of foreign vehicles not originally manufactured to North American specifications is difficult or impossible.

Structure

FMVSS are divided into three categories: crash avoidance (100-series), crashworthiness (200-series), and post-crash survivability (300-series). The first regulation, FMVSS No. 209, was adopted on 1 March 1967 and remains in force to date though its requirements have been periodically updated and made more stringent. It stipulates the requirements for seat belts in roadgoing vehicles.

Other FMVSS include:

Crash avoidance

 FMVSS No. 101: Controls and displays
 FMVSS No. 102: Transmission shift lever sequence, starter interlock, and transmission braking effect
 FMVSS No. 103: Windshield defrosting and defogging systems
 FMVSS No. 104: Windshield wiping and washing systems
 FMVSS No. 105: Hydraulic and electric brake systems
 FMVSS No. 106: Brake hoses
 FMVSS No. 107:  [Reserved] (previously "Reflecting surfaces", rescinded in 1996)
 FMVSS No. 108: Lamps, reflective device and associated equipment
 FMVSS No. 109: New pneumatic tires for passenger cars
 FMVSS No. 110: Tire selection and rims for passenger cars
 FMVSS No. 111: Rear view and side view mirrors
 FMVSS No. 112: [Reserved] (previously "Headlamp concealment devices", canceled in 1996 and incorporated into #108)
 FMVSS No. 113: Hood latch system
 FMVSS No. 114: Theft Protection
 FMVSS No. 115:  [Reserved] (previously "Vehicle identification number", moved to Part 565 in 1983)
 FMVSS No. 116: Motor vehicle brake fluids
 FMVSS No. 117: Retreaded pneumatic tires
 FMVSS No. 118: Power-operated window, partition, and roof panel systems
 FMVSS No. 119: New pneumatic tires for vehicles other than passenger cars
 FMVSS No. 120: Tire selection and rims for motor vehicles other than passenger cars
 FMVSS No. 121: Air brake systems
 FMVSS No. 122: Motorcycle brake systems
 FMVSS No. 123: Motorcycle controls and displays
 FMVSS No. 124: Accelerator control systems
 FMVSS No. 125: Warning devices
 FMVSS No. 126: Electronic stability control systems
 FMVSS No. 127:  [Reserved] (previously "Speedometers and odometers", revoked in 1982)
 FMVSS No. 128:  [Reserved] (previously "Fields of direct view", rescinded in 1981)
 FMVSS No. 129: New non-pneumatic tires for passenger cars- new temporary spare non-pneumatic tires for use on passenger cars
 FMVSS No. 131: School bus pedestrian safety devices
 FMVSS No. 135: Light vehicle brake systems
 FMVSS No. 136: Electronic stability control systems on heavy vehicles
 FMVSS No. 138: Tire-pressure monitoring systems
 FMVSS No. 139: New pneumatic radial tires for light vehicles
 FMVSS No. 140: [Proposed] ("Parts and Accessories Necessary for Safe Operation; Speed Limiting Devices", released for public comment in September 2016)
 FMVSS No. 141: Minimum sound requirements for hybrid and electric vehicles

Crashworthiness

 FMVSS No. 201: Occupant protection in interior impact
 FMVSS No. 202: Head restraints for passenger vehicles
 FMVSS No. 203: Impact protection for the driver from the steering control system
 FMVSS No. 204: Steering control rearward displacement
 FMVSS No. 205: Glazing materials
 FMVSS No. 206: Door locks and door retention components
 FMVSS No. 207: Seating Systems
 FMVSS No. 208: Occupant crash protection
 FMVSS No. 209: Seat belt assemblies
 FMVSS No. 210: Seat belt anchorages
 FMVSS No. 211:  [Reserved] (previously "Wheel nuts, wheel discs and hub caps")
 FMVSS No. 212: Windshield mounting
 FMVSS No. 213: Child restraint systems
 FMVSS No. 214: Side impact protection
 FMVSS No. 215:  [Reserved] (previously "Exterior protection")
 FMVSS No. 216: Roof crush resistance
 FMVSS No. 217: Bus emergency exits and window retention and release.
 FMVSS No. 218: Motorcycle helmets
 FMVSS No. 219: Windshield zone intrusion
 FMVSS No. 220: School bus rollover protection
 FMVSS No. 221: School bus body joint strength
 FMVSS No. 222: School bus passenger seating and crash protection
 FMVSS No. 223: Rear impact guards
 FMVSS No. 224: Rear impact protection
 FMVSS No. 225: Child restraint anchorage systems
 FMVSS No. 226: Ejection mitigation
 FMVSS No. 227: Bus rollover structural integrity

Post-crash survivability
 FMVSS No. 301: Fuel system integrity
 FMVSS No. 302: Flammability of interior materials
 FMVSS No. 303: Fuel system integrity of compressed natural gas vehicles
 FMVSS No. 304: Compressed natural gas fuel container integrity
 FMVSS No. 305: Electric-powered vehicles:  Electrolyte spillage and electrical shock protection

Miscellaneous
 FMVSS No. 401: Interior trunk release
 FMVSS No. 402:  [Reserved] (previously "Radiator and coolant reservoir caps venting of motor vehicle coolant systems")
 FMVSS No. 403: Platform lift systems for motor vehicles
 FMVSS No. 404: Platform lift installation in motor vehicles
 FMVSS No. 500: Low-speed vehicles

Other regulations relating to transportation
Aside from the FMVSS in Part 571, there are numerous federal regulations pertaining to motor vehicles under Title 49, including:

 Part 523: Vehicle Classification
 Part 525: Exemptions from average fuel economy standards
 Part 526: Petitions and plans for relief under the Automobile Fuel Efficiency Act of 1980
 Part 529: Manufacturers of multistage automobiles
 Part 531: Passenger automobile average fuel economy standards
 Part 533: Light truck fuel economy standards
 Part 534: Rights and responsibilities of manufacturers in the context of changes in corporate relationships
 Part 536: Transfer and trading of fuel economy credits
 Part 537: Automotive fuel economy reports
 Part 538: Manufacturing incentives for alternative fuel vehicles
 Part 541: Federal motor vehicle theft prevention standard
 Part 542: Procedures for selecting light duty truck lines to be covered by the theft prevention standard
 Part 543: Exemption from vehicle theft prevention standard
 Part 544: Insurer reporting requirements
 Part 545: Federal motor vehicle theft prevention standard phase-in and small-volume line reporting requirements
 Part 551: Procedural rules
 Part 552: Petitions for rulemaking, defect, and noncompliance orders
 Part 553: Rulemaking procedures
 Part 554: Standards enforcement and defects investigation
 Part 555: Temporary exemptions from motor vehicle safety and bumper standards
 Part 556: Exemption for inconsequential defect or noncompliance
 Part 557: Petitions for hearings on notification and remedy of defects
 Part 563: Event data recorders
 Part 564: Replaceable light source and sealed beam headlamp information
 Part 565: Vehicle identification number requirements
 Part 566: Manufacturer identification
 Part 567: Certification
 Part 568: Vehicles manufactured in two or more stages
 Part 569: Regrooved tires
 Part 570: Vehicle-In-Use inspection standards
 Part 572: Anthropomorphic test devices
 Part 573: Defect and noncompliance responsibility and reports
 Part 574: Tire identification and record keeping
 Part 575: Consumer information
 Part 576: Record retention
 Part 577: Defect and noncompliance notification
 Part 578: Civil and criminal penalties
 Part 579: Reporting of information and communications about potential defects
 Part 580: Odometer disclosure requirements
 Part 581: Bumper standard
 Part 582: Insurance cost information regulation
 Part 583: Automobile parts content labeling
 Part 585: Phase-in reporting requirements
 Part 586: [Reserved]
 Part 587: Deformable barriers
 Part 588: Child restraint system recordkeeping requirements
 Part 589: [Reserved]
 Part 590: [Reserved]
 Part 591: Importation of vehicles and equipment subject to federal safety, bumper, and theft prevention standards
 Part 592: Registered importers of vehicles not originally manufactured to conform to the Federal Motor Vehicle Safety Standards
 Part 593: Determinations that a vehicle not originally manufactured to conform to the Federal Motor Vehicle Safety Standards is eligible for importation
 Part 594: Schedule of fees authorized by 
 Part 595: Make inoperative exemptions
 Part 596: [Reserved]
 Part 597: [Reserved]
 Part 598: [Reserved]
 Part 599: Requirements and procedures for Consumer Assistance to Recycle and Save Act Program

References

External links
 List of FMCSA standards for motor vehicles
 
 Tests for compliance with various FMVSS (broken has to be fixed) 
 Overview of CMVSS at Transport Canada

Standards of the United States
Automotive safety
Vehicle law